Stanovo was one of five city municipalities which constituted the City of Kragujevac. According to the 2002 census, 39,252 residents lived in the municipality, while the urban area had 32,965 residents. The municipality was formed in May 2002, only to be dissolved in March 2008.

Inhabited places

The Municipality of Stanovo was composed of the following suburbs:

 Stanovo
 Veliko Polje
 Korićani
 Male Pčelice - Staro selo
 Male Pčelice-Novo Naselje
 Trešnjevak
 Adžine Livade
 Erdeč
 Vinjište
 Goločelo
 Grošnica
 Dragobraća
 Đuriselo
 Drenovac
 Drača
 Divostin
 Prekopeča
 Rogojevac
 Kutlovo

References

External links

Šumadija
Defunct urban municipalities of Kragujevac
Šumadija District